is the twenty-second single of idol group Morning Musume and was released May 12, 2004. It sold a total of 87,255 copies. The single peaked at #4 on the weekly Oricon charts, charting for six weeks.

The single was certified Gold by RIAJ for physical sales of over 100,000 units.

The Single V DVD was also released on the same day. The single was also released in a limited edition which came in special packaging with five B3-sized mini posters.

Track listings 
All lyrics are composed by Tsunku.

CD 
 
 
 "Roman (My Dear Boy) (Instrumental)"

Single V DVD 
 "Roman (My Dear Boy)"
 "Roman (My Dear Boy) (Close-Up Version)"

Featured lineup 
 1st generation: Kaori Iida
 2nd generation: Mari Yaguchi
 4th generation: Rika Ishikawa, Hitomi Yoshizawa, Nozomi Tsuji, Ai Kago
 5th generation: Ai Takahashi, Asami Konno, Makoto Ogawa, Risa Niigaki
 6th generation: Miki Fujimoto, Eri Kamei, Sayumi Michishige, Reina Tanaka

Roman~My Dear Boy~ Vocals

Main Voc: Rika Ishikawa, Ai Takahashi, Miki Fujimoto

Center Voc: Mari Yaguchi, Hitomi Yoshizawa, Eri Kamei, Reina Tanaka

Minor Voc: Kaori Iida, Nozomi Tsuji, Ai Kago, Asami Konno, Makoto Ogawa, Risa Niigaki, Sayumi Michishige

References

External links 
 "Roman (My Dear Boy)" entries on the Hello! Project official website: CD entry, Single V entry 

Morning Musume songs
Zetima Records singles
2004 singles
Songs written by Tsunku
Song recordings produced by Tsunku
Japanese-language songs
2004 songs